Holy Family of Nazareth Convent School was a girls school in Pitsford Hall in the village of Pitsford, Northamptonshire, England. The convent school was run by the Sisters of the Holy Family of Nazareth (The Holy Family Convent School), and existed from 1947–1984.

It was started after the Second World War as a Polish girls school for children of emigrants. The order of religious who took on the project was founded by Franciszka Siedliska who had opened the first Polish school in London in the 1890s. The "Pitsford" school provided education at elementary and secondary levels, finishing with the GCE – A level exam (the equivalent of the Polish ‘matura’ certificate).

In the 1970s and 1980s the school gained a multiethnic character; in the 1980s about 50% schoolgirls were of Polish origin, while the rest were native British. By 1984 about 1,500 girls had graduated from the school. After its closure it later reopened in 1989 as the Northamptonshire Grammar School (now Pitsford School).

See also
 Divine Mercy College
 Polish Catholic Mission
 Poles in the United Kingdom

References
A. Stawicka - "Pitsford"  Warsaw 2009

Defunct schools in West Northamptonshire District
Defunct Catholic schools in the Diocese of Northampton
Educational institutions established in 1947
1947 establishments in England
Educational institutions disestablished in 1984
1984 disestablishments in England